The Toyota Sprinter Carib is a station wagon produced by Toyota under the Sprinter nameplate from 1982 until 2002 for several different models below.

Sprinter Carib
Cars introduced in 1982